Caryomyia caryae, the hickory sticky globe gall midge, is a species of gall midges in the family Cecidomyiidae. It forms a small, globular gall with a pointed tip on the undersides of Hickory leaves.

References

Further reading

 
 

Cecidomyiinae
Articles created by Qbugbot
Insects described in 1862
Gall-inducing insects